Sŏnbong station is a railway station in Sŏnbong-ŭp, Sŏnbong county, Rason Special City, North Hamgyŏng province, North Korea on the Hambuk Line of the Korean State Railway; it is also the starting point of the Sŭngri branch to Sŭngri.

The station was opened on 16 November 1929 by the Chosen Government Railway (Sentetsu) at the same time as the mainline from Unggi (now Sŏnbong) to Sinasan.

References

Railway stations in North Korea
Railway stations opened in 1929
Buildings and structures in Rason